The Joe Hill Award is awarded annually at the Great Labor Arts Exchange by The Labor Heritage Foundation.

The award is named for Joe Hill, a radical songwriter, labor activist and member of the Industrial Workers of the World. He was executed for the murder of a Salt Lake City grocer and his son, a crime for which the police released a more likely suspect. Hill's conviction and unsuccessful appeal generated international calls for clemency, including by President Woodrow Wilson. Hill was memorialized in a tribute poem written about 1930 by Alfred Hayes, titled "I Dreamed I Saw Joe Hill Last Night" (often referred to simply as "Joe Hill"). Hayes's lyrics were turned into a song in 1936 by Earl Robinson. Paul Robeson and Pete Seeger often performed this song and are associated with it. Joan Baez's Woodstock performance of "Joe Hill" in 1969 is the most well-known recording.

The Labor Heritage Foundation began presenting the Joe Hill Award in 1989. The award, given during the foundation's annual Great Labor Arts Exchange arts festival, honors an individual for a body of work in the field of labor culture. Bev Grant was the recipient of the award in 2017.

External links
Labor Heritage Foundation

References 

Culture of Washington, D.C.
History of labor relations in the United States
Joe Hill (activist)
Arts awards in the United States
Awards established in 1989